Mutiu Shadimu is a Nigerian politician and a former member of the House of Representative of Nigeria representing Oshodi-Isolo I Federal Constituency after he emerged winner at the 2015 Nigerian General Election in April under the platform of the People's Democratic Party.

Education 
Mutiu attended Egba College, Ilaro, Ogun State where he obtained his West African Senior School Certificate in 1985. He is a fellow of the Institute of Chartered Accountant of NIgeria and Chartered Institute of Taxation of Nigeria.

Employment and politics 
Prior to becoming a member of the House of Representative, he was an Auditor, Tax And Management Consultant. In the 2015 elections, he contested for the Federal House of representatives under the Platform of the Peoples Democratic Party(PDP) and Won to represent Oshodi-Isolo I Federal Constituency.

References 

Yoruba politicians
Members of the House of Representatives (Nigeria)
Year of birth missing (living people)
Living people